Abraham Solomon Baylinson (6 January 1882 – May 1950) was a Russian-American painter who was active in the early modernist movement.

Early life and education 

Born in Moscow, Russia on 6 January 1882, the Baylinson family moved to the United States around 1892. Baylinson studied at the Art Students League of New York the National Academy of Design and the New York School of Art. While at the New York School of Art he trained under Robert Henri and alongside students such as Edward Hopper, Rockwell Kent, Yasuo Kuniyoshi, Glenn Coleman, Eugene Speicher, and Patrick Henry Bruce. He also studied under Homer Boss.

Artistic career 

He was secretary for the Society of Independent Artists from 1918 to 1934, and showed his work at the Society's shows from his joining in 1917 until 1942.
Baylinson was an instructor of drawing and painting at the Art Students League from 1931 to 1933. In early 1931 a fire destroyed almost twenty years of work related to Baylinson's career.  When he began painting after the fire his style had evolved into representational art.

He died on 6 May 1950 in New York City.

Notable exhibitions

Art Institute of Chicago
Corcoran Gallery of Art
Detroit Institute of Art
National Gallery of Canada
Pennsylvania Academy of Fine Art
Whitney Museum of American Art

Notable collections

Metropolitan Museum of Art
Museum of Fine Arts, Boston
Newark Museum

Further reading

Baylinson, A.S. A.S. Baylinson, 1882-1950: A memorial exhibition of paintings and conte crayon drawings : in the Art Students League Gallery, October 21st to November 10th, 1951. New York: The Gallery (1951).

References

1882 births
1950 deaths
Emigrants from the Russian Empire to the United States
Painters from New York City
Art Students League of New York alumni
Parsons School of Design alumni
20th-century American painters
American male painters
Modern painters
National Academy of Design alumni
Society of Independent Artists
20th-century American male artists